The Jabiluka ctenotus (Ctenotus arnhemensis)  is a species of skink found in Northern Territory in Australia.

References

arnhemensis
Reptiles described in 1981
Taxa named by Glen Milton Storr